The Royal Windsor Horse Show is a horse show held annually since 1943 for five days in May or June in Windsor Home Park.
The show is the only one in the United Kingdom to host international competition for dressage, show jumping, carriage driving and endurance riding. In addition, there are over 130 showing classes. 

Royal Windsor Horse Show was special in 2016 as the Queen celebrated her 90th birthday celebrations.

References

External links
Royal Windsor Horse Show official site

Windsor
Equestrian sports in the United Kingdom
1943 establishments in England
Windsor, Berkshire 
Equestrian sports in England
Events in Berkshire
Festivals established in 1943